Ishq Hai Tumse (stylised as ishq  tumse) is a 2004 Indian Hindi-language musical romance film starring Dino Morea and Bipasha Basu. The film is a remake of the Telugu film Sampangi (2001).

Plot
The film follows Arjun, a Hindu man played by Morea, and Khushbu, a Muslim woman played by Basu. Their fathers (portrayed by Vikram Gokhale and Alok Nath, respectively) become good friends. During a marriage ceremony, Arjun comes across Khushbu and falls in love with her. However, he decides to hide his feelings from her and his family because of their differences in religion.

When Arjun is about to confess his love to Khushbu, Arjun's father has a sudden kidney failure and is admitted to a hospital. Khushbu's parents arrange a marriage for her, and she, unaware of Arjun's love, obeys. This finally prods a desperate Arjun to admit his love for Khushbu.
The second time he musters the courage to express his feelings, Khushbu's father has a fake heart attack in order to free her from the man she is supposed to wed. In the hospital, Khushbu's father and Arjuns father approve of their kids undeniable love for each other.

Cast
 Dino Morea as Arjun Bhatt
 Bipasha Basu as Khushbu Anand
 Tiku Talsania as Raj Narain
 Beena as Laxmi
 Vikram Gokhale as Pandit Ji
 Dinesh Hingoo as Airport employee
 Alok Nath as Usman
 Himani Shivpuri as Kamla
 Resham Tipnis as Anjali Bhabhi
 Mohan Gokhale
 Neena Kulkarni
Amit Behl as Arjun Bhatt's elder brother

Music

Music Composed by Himesh Reshammiya. Lyrics were by Sameer

Reception 
A critic from Rediff.com wrote that "Why was Ishq Hai Tumse made?" A critic from Deccan Herald wrote that "A dud movie like this does nothing to revive Dino Morea’s run at the box office though he manages to turn in a fairly decent performance".

References

External links
 

Films scored by Himesh Reshammiya
2004 films
2000s Hindi-language films
Indian romantic musical films
Hindi remakes of Telugu films